Separated brethren is a term sometimes used by the Catholic Church and its clergy and members to refer to baptized members of other Christian traditions. The phrase is a translation of the Latin phrase fratres seiuncti. It is largely used as a polite euphemism in contexts where the terms "formal heretics" or "material heretics" might cause offense.

Since the Council of Trent, which formally condemned Protestant doctrines as heretical, the Catholic Church officially deems Protestants as material or formal "heretics" and has always taught that "outside the Church there is no salvation". However, Biblical passages like Romans 2:12-16 point to the importance of conscience in Catholic soteriology, which the Roman Catholic Church states it has always recognized. In  preparation work for draft texts of Second Vatican Council documents, a "report urged respectful use of the terms dissidents or separated brethren, in place of heretics and schismatics." After the Second Vatican Council, however, "that habit of unthinkingly hurling accusations of heresy at Protestants pretty much died out" in some contexts to avoid offense. Since at least the mid-1990s, the term has often been replaced by Catholic officials with phrases such as "other Christians".

A similar move to avoid causing offense occurred with some other religious groups as well. During a period of lessening tensions with Jewish groups, Pope John Paul II once referred to Jews as "elder brothers in the faith of Abraham", prior to a 1987 visit to the United States.

History
The concept and wording was published as late as 1793, in a discourse which examined two papal briefs to the Bishop of Chiusi-Pienza. Frank Flinn wrote, in Encyclopedia of Catholicism, that in 1959 Pope John XXIII "addressed Protestants as separated brethren," in Ad Petri cathedram (APC), which Flinn saw as "an important step toward recognizing Protestants as legitimate partners in a future dialogue." But Pope Leo XIII "was the first to speak of 'separated brothers according to John Norman Davidson Kelly's A Dictionary of Popes. Edward Farrugia, in Gregorianum, describes the development from Pope Leo XIII's Orientalium dignitas (OD) to Orientalium Ecclesiarum (OE) to Unitatis Redintegratio (UR). Whereas " 186 "speaks of 'dissident bretheren',  28 speaks of 'separated bretheren', although it does not go as far as  14, where there is an inchoative use of the language of 'sister Churches' in regards to the sisterhood of Eastern Churches." It does not refer to a sisterhood between Catholic and Orthodox Churches, nor between Catholic and Protestant Churches. Farrugia noted Austin Flannery's translations in Vatican Council II, " 29 speaks of the 'separated Churches' and  25 of 'any separated Eastern Christians', and  29 of 'Eastern separated brethren'." J. M. R. Tillard goes into detail, in New Catholic Encyclopedia, about "the development of a carefully nuanced vocabulary, consistent with Vatican II Ecclesiology," which evolved from "the idea of membership in favor of that of incorporation" and has its categorization found in the dogmatic constitution  (LG) which Tillard describes:
Catholics are defined as being incorporated', qualifying the term with the adverb 'fully' and emphasizing that full incorporation requires the presence of the Holy Spirit."
Non-Catholics and catechumens are defined as being linked' to the Church, again carefully stressing the role of the Holy Spirit in each case."
Non-Christians are defined as being related', a term that suggests a dynamic relationship, an orientation toward the Church."
"Every shade of difference in meaning among these terms is important," emphasizes Tillard. "But the terms acquire their full force only in the light of the most authoritative commentaries on them,"  and Nostra aetate (NA). "Then, supposing the nuances indicated, the richness of such expressions as the following becomes clear: 'Churches and ecclesial communities'; 'separated brethren'; 'separated Churches and ecclesial communities'; 'full communion'—'imperfect communion'."

"But thanks to its ecclesiology," wrote Tillard, "Vatican II was able to affirm at the same time that Churches or ecclesial communities separated from the Catholic Church are part of the single Church, and that nevertheless incorporation in Christ and His Church possesses within the Catholic Church the fullness that it does not have elsewhere." Tillard's view, however, went far beyond the texts of the Second Vatican Council, which never stated that "churches or ecclesial communities" separated from the Catholic Church were somehow "a part of it"; indeed, the Council itself in the decree Orientalium Ecclesiarum explicitly stated just the opposite: "The Holy Catholic Church, which is the Mystical Body of Christ, is made up of the faithful who are organically united in the Holy Spirit by the same faith, the same sacraments and the same government[...]." Tillard's view was further refuted in the document Dominus Iesus issued by Pope Benedict XVI.
  
In 2007, the Congregation for the Doctrine of the Faith (CDF) clarified "the authentic meaning" of the ecclesiological expression "Church" which "according to Catholic doctrine", the texts of the Second Vatican Council and those of the Magisterium since the Second Vatican Council do not call Christian Communities born out of the Reformation of the 16th century as "Churches" because "these Communities do not enjoy apostolic succession in the sacrament of Orders, and are, therefore, deprived of a constitutive element of the Church." William Whalen wrote, in Separated Brethren, that separated brethren' refers to Christians united by baptism and committed to Jesus Christ but divided by theological beliefs." Whalen explained, that Protestant Reformation Christians broke "the bond of common faith" and "they became separated brethren."
"All Christians who are baptized and believe in Christ but are not professed Catholics" are separated brethren, according to John Hardon in Modern Catholic Dictionary. "More commonly the term is applied to Protestants." Likewise, "separated brethren" according to Catholic Answers, in This Rock, "refers to those who, though separated from full communion with the Catholic Church, have been justified through baptism and are thus brethren in Christ."  "teaches that 'all who have been justified by faith in baptism are members of Christ's body, and have a right to be called Christian, and so are correctly accepted as brothers by the children of the Catholic Church'." J. A. Jungmann and K. Stasiak wrote, in New Catholic Encyclopedia, that "the Second Vatican Council's call for a greater spirit of ecumenism among churches and ecclesial communities reflects the understanding that Baptism is the effecting and the sign of the fundamental unity of all Christians."

Exclusions
Because Mormonism is polytheistic in its understanding of the Trinity, the Catholic Church does not recognize the validity of Mormon baptism and Mormons are not considered separated brethren." Cardinal Urbano Navarrete Cortés clarified, in L'Osservatore Romano, "that in all of the effects of the pastoral, administrative and juridical practices of the Church, the Mormons are not to be considered as belonging to an 'ecclesial community not in full communion with the Catholic Church', but simply as non-baptized."

Baptism conferred by The Christian Community, founded by Rudolf Steiner; The New Church, founded by Emanuel Swedenborg; conferred with the formula "I baptize you in the name of the Creator, and of the Redeemer, and of the Sanctifier"; or, conferred with the formula "I baptize you in the name of the Creator, and of the Liberator, and of the Sustainer" are also deemed not valid.

Notes

References

Catholic Church and ecumenism
Christian terminology
Euphemisms
Phrases